Kharkivska is a station of Kyiv Metro's Syretsko-Pecherska Line. It is between the Pozniaky and Vyrlytsia stations. This station was opened on 28 December 1994.

The station was designed by architects Hnievyshev, Tselikovska, Panchenko. It has two main entrances. Kharkivska is at the intersection of Mykoly Bazhan Avenue and Revutska Street. This station is near the Kharkivskyi Masyv, one of Kyiv's neighborhoods. That is why this station is called Kharkivska.

Kharkivska operates from 05:50 to 00:02.

External links 

  Kyivsky Metropoliten - Station description and Photographs
  Metropoliten.kiev.ua - Station description and Photographs

Kyiv Metro stations
Railway stations opened in 1994
1994 establishments in Ukraine